Aleksandr Alekseyevich Semyonov (born 9 May 1983) is a former Russian professional football player.

Club career
He played two seasons in the Russian Football National League for FC Kristall Smolensk and FC Petrotrest St. Petersburg.

External links
 
 Career summary by sportbox.ru

1983 births
People from Gatchinsky District
Living people
Russian footballers
Association football goalkeepers
FC Kristall Smolensk players
FC Petrotrest players
FC Spartak Kostroma players
Sportspeople from Leningrad Oblast